Metrolytoceras is an extinct cephalopod genus that lived during the Middle Jurassic, characterized by a planispiral evolute shell with smooth middle and outer whorls, flat sides and simplified sutures.

Metrolytoceras belongs to the ammonoid suborder Lytoceratina, which is typified by having intricate, moss-like sutures, and to the family Lytoceratidae. Its closest relative is Megalytoceras

References
Notes

Bibliography
 

Middle Jurassic ammonites
Ammonitida genera
Lytoceratidae